The following are lists of members of the Victorian Legislative Council:

 Members of the Victorian Legislative Council, 1851–1853
 Members of the Victorian Legislative Council, 1853–1856
 Members of the Victorian Legislative Council, 1856–1858
 Members of the Victorian Legislative Council, 1858–1860
 Members of the Victorian Legislative Council, 1860–1862
 Members of the Victorian Legislative Council, 1862–1864
 Members of the Victorian Legislative Council, 1864–1866
 Members of the Victorian Legislative Council, 1866–1868
 Members of the Victorian Legislative Council, 1868–1870
 Members of the Victorian Legislative Council, 1870–1872
 Members of the Victorian Legislative Council, 1872–1874
 Members of the Victorian Legislative Council, 1874–1876
 Members of the Victorian Legislative Council, 1876–1878
 Members of the Victorian Legislative Council, 1878–1880
 Members of the Victorian Legislative Council, 1880–1882
 Members of the Victorian Legislative Council, 1882–1884
 Members of the Victorian Legislative Council, 1884–1886
 Members of the Victorian Legislative Council, 1886–1888
 Members of the Victorian Legislative Council, 1888–1890
 Members of the Victorian Legislative Council, 1890–1892
 Members of the Victorian Legislative Council, 1892–1894
 Members of the Victorian Legislative Council, 1894–1895
 Members of the Victorian Legislative Council, 1895–1896
 Members of the Victorian Legislative Council, 1896–1898
 Members of the Victorian Legislative Council, 1898–1900
 Members of the Victorian Legislative Council, 1900–1901
 Members of the Victorian Legislative Council, 1901–1902
 Members of the Victorian Legislative Council, 1902–1904
 Members of the Victorian Legislative Council, 1904–1907
 Members of the Victorian Legislative Council, 1907–1910
 Members of the Victorian Legislative Council, 1910–1913
 Members of the Victorian Legislative Council, 1913–1916
 Members of the Victorian Legislative Council, 1916–1919
 Members of the Victorian Legislative Council, 1919–1922
 Members of the Victorian Legislative Council, 1922–1925
 Members of the Victorian Legislative Council, 1925–1928
 Members of the Victorian Legislative Council, 1928–1931
 Members of the Victorian Legislative Council, 1931–1934
 Members of the Victorian Legislative Council, 1934–1937
 Members of the Victorian Legislative Council, 1937–1940
 Members of the Victorian Legislative Council, 1940–1943
 Members of the Victorian Legislative Council, 1943–1946
 Members of the Victorian Legislative Council, 1946–1949
 Members of the Victorian Legislative Council, 1949–1952
 Members of the Victorian Legislative Council, 1952–1955
 Members of the Victorian Legislative Council, 1955–1958
 Members of the Victorian Legislative Council, 1958–1961
 Members of the Victorian Legislative Council, 1961–1964
 Members of the Victorian Legislative Council, 1964–1967
 Members of the Victorian Legislative Council, 1967–1970
 Members of the Victorian Legislative Council, 1970–1973
 Members of the Victorian Legislative Council, 1973–1976
 Members of the Victorian Legislative Council, 1976–1979
 Members of the Victorian Legislative Council, 1979–1982
 Members of the Victorian Legislative Council, 1982–1985
 Members of the Victorian Legislative Council, 1985–1988
 Members of the Victorian Legislative Council, 1988–1992
 Members of the Victorian Legislative Council, 1992–1996
 Members of the Victorian Legislative Council, 1996–1999
 Members of the Victorian Legislative Council, 1999–2002
 Members of the Victorian Legislative Council, 2002–2006
 Members of the Victorian Legislative Council, 2006–2010
 Members of the Victorian Legislative Council, 2010–2014
 Members of the Victorian Legislative Council, 2014–2018
Members of the Victorian Legislative Council, 2018–2022